Chalyboclydon' flexilinea is a moth in the family Geometridae first described by William Warren in 1898. It is found in Myanmar and the Indian state of Sikkim.

Taxonomy
The generic placement of Chalyboclydon flexilinea is unclear. It is not congeneric with the type species of Chalyboclydon. However, it has not been placed in another genus yet.

References

Moths described in 1898
Larentiinae
Moths of Asia